Julian Edward Wood (May 3, 1844 – June 2, 1911) was a co-founder of Pi Kappa Alpha Fraternity.

Biography
Wood was the son of William Edward Wood and Sophia Marchant (Trotman) Wood and was born in 1844 in Currituck County, North Carolina.  His father, a physician, later lived at Hampton, Virginia and in Norfolk, Virginia. At Hampton, his home was the site of the present Hampton Institute (now Hampton University). Most of the son's early life was spent around Hampton Roads, Virginia.

When still of high school age, he volunteered for service in the Confederate Army at the outbreak of the Civil War. He was assigned to drilling troops from his native eastern North Carolina as early as June 1861, and he spent the rest of that year as a drill master.

Because his father insisted that he further his education Wood entered Virginia Military Institute on January 9, 1862, from Hickory Groves, Norfolk County, Virginia. His father's occupation was listed as "farming". His cadetship extended over a period of two years and ten months at V.M.I. and he earned the sobriquet Ajax because of his size and prowess.  Wood was suspended in January, 1864 for being absent from barracks after taps. He was reinstated the following month by the V.M.I. Board of Visitors.

Wood served as a corporal in Company C in the V.M.I. Cadet Corps which was ordered in May 1864 to join the Confederate Army of Major General John C. Breckinridge, who was attempting to stop a Union advance up the Shenandoah Valley. At New Market, Virginia on May 14, 1864, a rainy Sunday afternoon, a corps of 247 teenage V.M.I. cadets, with no battle experience, held a sector of Confederate front lines against an assault by seasoned Federal troops headed by Major General Franz Sigel. The esprit among the V.M.I. cadets enabled them to turn what might have been a defeat for Breckinridge into an astounding victory, now known as the Battle of New Market. In this battle Wood was "on the colors," or urging the cadet colors onward. Actually the flag "urged forward" was not the Confederate flag but the V.M.I. Cadet flag. Federal troops seeing it are reported to have assumed that troops of a foreign nation had joined forces with Breckinridge's troops.

In 1867, Wood entered the University of Virginia to study medicine.

Wood attended the University of Virginia two years, then finished his M.D. degree at Baltimore Medical College in 1869. At the completion of his education, he practiced medicine in Elizabeth City, North Carolina. He married Mary Scott (b. 1846) and they had two children, a son William E. Wood (b. 1880) and a daughter Annie M. Wood (b. 1876).

Wood died in 1911 of illness.  Wood is buried among the maples in the cemetery of his adopted home, Elizabeth City, North Carolina.

External links

 Pi Kappa Alpha at www.pka.org

1844 births
1911 deaths
University of Virginia School of Medicine alumni
Pi Kappa Alpha founders
Virginia Military Institute alumni
People from Currituck County, North Carolina
People from Elizabeth City, North Carolina